This is a list of the albums ranked number one in the United States during 2018. The top-performing albums and EPs in the United States are ranked in the Billboard 200 chart, which is published by Billboard magazine. The data are compiled by Nielsen Soundscan based on each album's weekly physical and digital sales, as well as on-demand streaming and digital sales of its individual tracks.

In 2018, a total of 41 albums claimed the top position of the chart. The year began with Revival, the ninth studio album by an American rapper Eminem, on the first issue dated January 3, 2018, and witnessed the return of Taylor Swift's sixth studio album, Reputation, to the number one spot for a fourth chart-topping week after staying atop the chart for three consecutive weeks in 2017.

Scorpion  by Canadian rapper Drake earned 732,000 units in its first week, marking the largest opening week sales of 2018, followed by rapper Travis Scott's third studio album, Astroworld, which moved 537,000 units in its first week. The soundtrack of The Greatest Showman (2017) was the best selling album of 2018, with 1.491 million copies sold. It was the third most consumed album of 2018, with 2.499 million units. Scorpion was the most consumed album of 2018 with 3.905 million units, of which only 330,000 were sales. It was followed by Beerbongs & Bentleys by American singer and rapper Post Malone, which was the second most-consumed album with 3.251 million units. Nevertheless, Reputation was the best performing album of 2018, topping the Billboard 200 year-end chart.

Chart history

See also
 2018 in American music
 List of Billboard Hot 100 number ones of 2018

References

2018
United States Albums